The Greatest Canadian Invention is a television mini-series originally aired on CBC Television. It is a spiritual sequel to The Greatest Canadian.
It began with people voting online which invention (out of 50) they considered the greatest Canadian invention. The show is a two-hour special, hosted by Bob McDonald (Quirks and Quarks), that premiered on 3 January 2007 at 8:00 EST.

Commentators
The 22 commentators for the show are:
Margaret Atwood – Writer and inventor of the LongPen
Buck 65 – Hip hop musician
Jackie Duffin – Medical History professor at Queen's University
Will Ferguson – Author and Humorist
Danielle Goyette – Hockey player and Olympic gold medallist
Chris Hadfield – Astronaut
Mike Holmes – Home renovation specialist, TV host of Holmes on Homes
Mike Lazaridis – President of Research In Motion; inventor of the BlackBerry
Preston Manning – Trustee of the Manning Innovation Awards
Patrick McKenna – Comedian and actor
Miriam McDonald – Actress and star of Degrassi: The Next Generation
Mitsou – Singer and CBC TV host
Steve Nash – Basketball player, 2 time NBA MVP
Kathryn O'Hara – Professor of Science Journalism at Carleton University
Abena Otchere – Science education advocate and medical student
Drew Hayden Taylor – Playwright and columnist
Debbie Travis – Home decoration specialist and TV host of Painted House
Vikram Vij – Chef/restaurateur and cookbook author
Michael Winter – Writer
Ronald Wright – Writer
Judy Cornish & Joyce Gunhouse (Comrags) – Women's clothes fashion designers

Inventions
The inventions, in voted order, are:

See also
 Canadian Made, 2012 television series

External links
 The Greatest Canadian Invention Homepage

2006 Canadian television series debuts
2006 Canadian television series endings
Greatest Nationals
2000s Canadian reality television series
CBC Television original programming
Canadian television series based on British television series